Žarko Drašković (born 26 September 1965) is a Montenegrin football player.

Drašković began his career with FK Sutjeska Nikšić. He played for S.C. Salgueiros, S.C. Beira-Mar and S.C. Farense in the Portuguese Liga. He also had a brief spell with Ethnikos Piraeus F.C. in the Greek Super League during the 1995–96 season.

References

1965 births
Living people
Yugoslav footballers
FK Sutjeska Nikšić players
S.C. Salgueiros players
S.C. Beira-Mar players
S.C. Farense players
Ethnikos Piraeus F.C. players
Association football midfielders